Town Toyota Center is a 4,300-seat multi-purpose arena in Wenatchee, Washington. The arena was built and is owned and managed by the Wenatchee Public Facilities District (PFD).  It is the home venue of the Wenatchee Wild, an ice hockey team in the British Columbia Hockey League, and the Wenatchee Valley Skyhawks, an arena football team. It was formerly home to the Wenatchee Wolves and the Wenatchee Valley Venom.

During planning and early construction, the arena was known as the Greater Wenatchee Regional Events Center, but in August 2008, a local auto dealer bought the naming rights of the arena for an undisclosed amount, giving the arena its current name.

Default
In 2006, nine local cities and counties formed a municipal corporation then called the Greater Wenatchee Regional Events Center Public Facilities District to fund the Town Toyota Center. The arena went into default on December 1, 2011 when the PFD missed a payment on short term bond anticipation notes. The district was later fined by the Securities and Exchange Commission for misleading investors. It was the first time that the SEC assessed a financial penalty against a municipal issuer. The district settled with the SEC for $20,000. In 2012, legislation was passed and signed by Governor Gregoire to authorized a local sales tax increase to refinance the debt. The default was the largest public default in Washington State since the WPPSS disaster of 1982 that defaulted on $2.25 billion in bonds. In the fine the SEC also named the developer Global Entertainment and its then-president and CEO Richard Kozuback, the bankers, and a staff finance manager.

Notable events 
High School Musical: The Ice Tour – October 29-November 2, 2008
Newsboys – March 26, 2009
Tech N9ne – April 26, 2010 and November 2, 2011
Backstreet Boys "This Is Us" Tour – August 4, 2010
Paul Wall, Slim Thug, Ying Yang Twins, and Neema – May 6, 2011
Bill Engvall – July 31, 2011
Washington Supreme Court upholds lower court ruling that the debt limit was exceed - September 8, 2011
Amy Grant & Michael W. Smith 2 Friends Tour – September 15, 2011
BB King – November 16, 2011
Ron White – November 20, 2011
Mannheim Steamroller – December 20, 2011
The Bad Boys of Arenacross – January 13–14, 2012 and December 27–28, 2013
Styx – February 1, 2012
Stars On Ice – February 27, 2012 and May 16, 2014
Harlem Globetrotters – February 16, 2011 and February 27, 2012 and February 19, 2014
Michael Londra's Beyond Celtic – March 15, 2012
Kelly Clarkson - April 13, 2012
TNA Live! – April 28, 2012
Sesame Street LIVE!: Elmo Makes Music – May 15–16, 2012
Joan Sebastian – August 30, 2013
Larry the Cable Guy - January 15, 2014
Chicago - March 18, 2014
Gloria Trevi – April 18, 2014, with Carlito Olivero
Marco Antonio Solis - August 30, 2015

See also
 List of sports venues with the name Toyota

References

External links
Venue information

Indoor ice hockey venues in the United States
Sports venues in Washington (state)
Buildings and structures in Wenatchee, Washington
Tourist attractions in Chelan County, Washington
Government finances in the United States
Indoor arenas in Washington (state)
Sports venues completed in 2008
2008 establishments in Washington (state)